South Korean boy group Shinee, produced and managed by SM Entertainment, has been in the music business since 2008 and have released twelve studio albums (two of which were split releases), four live albums, ten video albums, six extended plays (EPs), thirty-seven singles and forty-two music videos. They have also participated in singing ten soundtracks for various Korean dramas and have been a part of the SM Town's winter vacation album 2011 Winter SMTown – The Warmest Gift and the summer vacation album 2009 Summer SMTown – We Are Shining with other fellow SM artists.

Shinee debuted in May 2008 with their first EP Replay which spawned the single "Replay" and later released their first studio album The Shinee World. It peaked at number three on the MIAK (Music Industry Association of Korea) chart and was later re-released as Amigo (2008). The album spawned two more singles: "Love Like Oxygen" and "Amigo". Shinee's second EP, Romeo was released 2009 which contained their fourth single, "Juliette". The release was soon followed by their third EP, 2009, Year of Us (2009) with the lead single "Ring Ding Dong". Their second studio album, Lucifer was released in 2010 and peaked at number one on the Gaon Album Chart and produced a Korean top ten single, "Lucifer". The 2010 reissue of the album titled Hello also charted at number one on the Gaon Album Chart and sold over 100,000 physical units in South Korea. It spawned the Gaon Digital Chart top 10 single "Hello", which sold over one million digital copies.

Shinee's fourth EP, Sherlock, was released in 2012. The lead single "Sherlock (Clue + Note)" claimed the top spot on the Gaon Digital Chart and charted third on the Korea K-Pop Hot 100 chart and became the group's highest-selling digital single in South Korea, with over 1.7 million digital downloads. In 2013, Shinee released two-part studio albums Dream Girl – The Misconceptions of You and Why So Serious? – The Misconceptions of Me, which were later re-released as The Misconceptions of Us (2013). The same year, the group released their fifth EP Everybody and another number one single "Everybody". Shinee was one of the biggest-selling K-pop acts in America in 2013, becoming one of the first Korean musicians to rank on Billboards year-end World Albums chart. In 2015, Shinee released their fourth studio album Odd with the lead single "View" which claimed the top of the charts. The reissue of the album, Married to the Music, was released the same year with four additional songs. The fifth studio album, 1 of 1 (2016), was released with the title track of the same name, along with a later release of 1 and 1, the album's repackage. The group returned with their sixth studio album, The Story of Light (2018), in celebration of their tenth anniversary. The album was released in three parts, each with a separate title track: "Good Evening", "I Want You" and "Our Page".  In 2021, Shinee released their seventh studio album, Don't Call Me, with the lead single of the same name, along with the later release of the album's repackaged version Atlantis.

A Japanese version of "Replay", released as "Replay (Kimi wa Boku no Everything)", was Shinee's first Japanese-language release and peaked at number two on the Oricon Singles Chart. In the first week of sales, it sold over 91,000 copies, setting a new record for the debut single of a Korean idol group in Japan. They then released their first Japanese studio album, The First (2011). Their first original Japanese song, "Dazzling Girl", which was released as a double A-side single with another Japanese original song "Run With Me", ranked at number two on the Oricon Charts and was certified Gold by RIAJ. The group released their second Japanese album Boys Meet U in 2013. This was followed by their third, fourth and fifth studio albums I'm Your Boy (2014), D×D×D (2016) and Five (2017). In 2021, they released their first Japanese EP, Superstar.

Albums

Studio albums

Reissues

Compilation albums

Live albums

Extended plays

Singles

Soundtrack appearances

Other charted songs

Videography

Video albums

Music videos

Lyric videos

Other music videos

See also
List of songs recorded by Shinee
List of awards and nominations received by Shinee

Notes

References

discography
Discographies of South Korean artists
K-pop music group discographies